Jologs is a 2002 Filipino teen, comedy-drama film directed by Gilbert Perez and released by Star Cinema. The film featured an ensemble cast as well as cameos from well-known Filipino celebrities. Jologs is a Filipino pejorative that is used to describe a tawdry person who belongs to the lower class.

Plot
The first character shown is Ruben (John Prats). A college student, his job at Barako Café owned by Trigger (Onemig Bondoc) is not nearly enough to pay his tuition. Having lost his scholarship on a technicality, Ruben resorts to burglary at his father's house in order to cover his educational expenses. What ensues is a comedic overly choreographed fight-scene complete with wire work and overdone martial arts action.

Shona (Michelle Bayle) leaves her daughter and her boyfriend Mando (played by Diether Ocampo) in order to return to work in Japan as an exotic dancer. Her predicament exemplifies the situation of every Filipino person who has come to the realization that life in the Philippines often does not allow the working person to earn money enough to save for a better living.

Cher (Baron Geisler) is a drag queen who, because of her sexuality, becomes the victim of violent homophobic aggression. His performance, while exaggeratedly comic, touches on the ugliness of homophobia and sexual discrimination. And yet the issue is never resolved, because Cher’s attackers are not punished for their hate crime. Neither is Shona condemned for abandoning her child in this instance of labor export from the Philippines, and the effects that it has on the people who must be left. Ruben’s moral and practical dilemma remains unresolved as well.

The lives of three couples: Iza (Assunta de Rossi) and Iñigo (Dominic Ochoa), Kulas (Vhong Navarro) and Joan (Julia Clarete), and Dino (Patrick Garcia) and Faith (Jodi Sta. Maria) deal with objectification, unrequited love, and first sexual experiences, respectively.

Cast

Main roles

Diether Ocampo as Mando
Patrick Garcia as Dino
Vhong Navarro as Kulas
Onemig Bondoc as Trigger
Dominic Ochoa as Iñigo
John Prats as Ruben
Jodi Sta. Maria as Faith
Julia Clarete as Joan
Baron Geisler as Cher
Michelle Bayle as Shona
Assunta De Rossi as Iza
Matt Ranillo III as Mr. Morales
Jean Saburit as Mrs. Morales
Maribeth Bichara as Mrs. Chavez

Supporting roles
Bentong as Juanito
Nikki Valdez as Iza's friend
Denise Joaquin as Iza's friend
Sean Ignacio as Bryan
Farrah Florer as Violeta
Perla Bautista as Ruben's grandmother

Cameos
Kris Aquino as herself
Bobet Vidanes as the Game KNB? contestant
Judy Ann Santos as a customer of Barako Cafe
Piolo Pascual as a customer of Barako Cafe
Camille Prats as pedestrian
Heart Evangelista as a pedestrian
Angelica Panganiban the girl carrying the birthday cake of Dino
Leandro Muñoz as the airport official
Gabe Mercado as the Pastor
Carlo Muñoz as the taxi driver
Christian Vasquez as Joan's boyfriend
Regine Tolentino as the restaurant waitress
Justin Cuyugan as a bus conductor
Bearwin Meily as the village guard
Hyubs Azarcon as the village guard
Andrea del Rosario as the student assistant
Minnie Aguilar as the guidance councilor
Carlo Aquino as Dino's birthday guest
Janus Del Prado as birthday guest
Nicole Anderson as birthday guest
Sarah Christophers as birthday guest
Kristopher Peralta as frat-man
Don Laurel as frat-man
Lui Villaruz as Barako Cafe security guard
Stage crew as KTV customers

Production

Development
The script for the film was selected for the top prize at the first annual Star Cinema Scriptwriting Contest.

Post-Production
The majority of the visual effects were handled by Roadrunner Network, Inc. The titles were handled by Cinemagic. The films were printed by LVN Pictures.

Soundtrack
The original film score of the film was composed and conducted by Jesse Lucas.

Jologs: Original Motion Picture Soundtrack is the official soundtrack album of the film published by Star Records. The soundtrack features songs from well-known Filipino artists including Roselle Nava, Gloc-9 and Piolo Pascual. The theme song entitled "Next In Line" was originally sung by Wency Cornejo of the band AfterImage, it was re-recorded specifically for the film by the band Stagecrew. Another track from the film is a song entitled "Jologs" performed by the rapper Gloc-9.

Release

Home media
The Region-3 DVD of the film was released on January 17, 2006, by Star Home Video.

Recognitions

2003 Gawad Urian Awards
Nominated Best Actor for Vhong Navarro
Nominated Best Editing for Vito Cajili
Nominated Best Music for Jesse Lucas
Nominated Best Screenplay for Ned Trespeces

References

External links

Philippine teen films
Star Cinema films